The 2000 du Maurier Classic was contested from August 10–13 at Royal Ottawa Golf Club. It was the 28th edition of the du Maurier Classic, first held in 1973, and the 22nd and final edition as a major championship on the LPGA Tour. Following Imperial Tobacco Canada being forced to withdraw its sponsorship of the tournament because of Tobacco Act regulations in the country, the LPGA stripped the tournament of major status and replaced it with the Women's British Open in the UK.

This event was won by Meg Mallon.

Final leaderboard

External links
 Golf Observer source

Canadian Women's Open
Sport in Gatineau
du Maurier Classic
du Maurier Classic
du Maurier Classic
du Maurier Classic